Electron optics is a mathematical framework for the calculation of electron trajectories along electromagnetic fields. The term optics is used because magnetic and electrostatic lenses act upon a charged particle beam similarly to optical lenses upon a light beam.

Electron optics calculations are crucial for the design of electron microscopes and particle accelerators. In the paraxial approximation, trajectory calculations can be carried out using ray transfer matrix analysis.

Electron properties 

Electrons are charged particles (point charges with rest mass) with spin 1/2 (hence they are fermions). Electrons can be accelerated by suitable electric (or magnetic) fields, thereby acquiring kinetic energy. Given sufficient voltage, the electron can be accelerated sufficiently fast to exhibit measurable relativistic effects. According to wave particle duality, electrons can also be considered as matter waves with properties such as wavelength, phase and amplitude.

Geometric electron optics

Magnetic fields 
Electrons interact with magnetic fields according to the second term of the Lorentz force: a cross product between the magnetic field and the electron velocity. In an infinite uniform field this results in a circular motion of the electron around the field direction with a radius given by:

where r is the orbit radius, m is the mass of an electron, is the component of the electron velocity perpendicular to the field, e is the electron charge and B is the magnitude of the applied magnetic field. Electrons that have a velocity component parallel to the magnetic field will proceed along helical trajectories.

Electric fields 
In the case of an applied electrostatic field, an electron will deflect towards the positive gradient of the field. Notably, this crossing of electrostatic field lines means that electrons, as they move through electrostatic fields change the magnitude of their velocity, whereas in magnetic fields, only the velocity direction is modified.

As electrons can exhibit non-particle (wave-like) effects such as diffraction, a full analysis of electron paths can be obtained by solving Maxwell's equation—however in many situations, the particle interpretation may provide a sufficient approximation with great reduction in complexity.

One further property of electrons is that they interact strongly with matter as they are sensitive to not only the nucleus, but also the matter's electron charge cloud. Therefore, electrons require vacuum to propagate any reasonable distance, such as would be desirable in electron optic system.

Penetration in vacuum is dictated by mean free path, a measure of the probability of collision between electrons and matter, approximate values for which can be derived from Poisson statistics.

Relativistic theory 
Although not very common, it is also possible to derive effects of magnetic structures to charged particles starting from the Dirac equation.

Diffractive electron optics

A sub-relativistic free electron propagating in vacuum can be accurately described as a de Broglie matter wave with a wavelength inversely proportional to its longitudinal momentum. As a result of the charge carried by the electron, electric fields, magnetic fields, or the electrostatic mean inner potential of thin, weakly interacting materials can impart a phase shift to the wavefront of an electron. Thickness-modulated silicon nitride membranes and programmable phase shift devices have exploited these properties to apply spatially varying phase shifts to control the far-field spatial intensity and phase of the electron wave. Devices like these have been applied to arbitrarily shape the electron wavefront, correct the aberrations inherent to electron microscopes, resolve the orbital angular momentum of a free electron, and to measure dichroism in the interaction between free electrons and magnetic materials or plasmonic nanostructures.

See also 
 Charged particle beam
 Strong focusing
 Electron beam technology
 Electron microscope
 Beam emittance
 Ernst Ruska
 Hemispherical electron energy analyzer

Further reading
 Hawkes, P. W. & Kasper, E. (1994). Principles of Electron Optics. Academic Press. .
 Pozzi, G. (2016). Particles and Waves in Electron Optics and Microscopy. Academic Press.  .

References 

Electromagnetism
Accelerator physics